Isola Minore, known until the twentieth century simply as l'isoletta (‘the little island’), is the smallest of the three islands of Lago Trasimeno in central Italy, and the closest to Passignano sul Trasimeno within whose municipal boundaries it lies. It rises to about 20 metres above the level of the lake (itself 258 m above sea level), and takes the form of a comma with dimensions of about 450 x 260 m and an area of some 5 hectares. It is about 470 m NE of the larger island of Isola Maggiore. Isola Minore is covered by woodland, with pines and holm oaks providing protection for the nesting sites of numerous cormorants.

In the Middle Ages it had rather a large population. During the fifteenth century however the inhabitants transferred en masse to the mainland to escape from the depredations of brigands and subsequently it has been home only to the occasional hermit. Today the island is in private ownership and uninhabited. It is not on any of the ferry routes and there is no jetty or other dedicated facilities for moorage.

Notes 
This article originated as a translation of this version of its counterpart in the Italian Wikipedia.

Landforms of Umbria
Province of Perugia
Islands of the Trasimeno Lake
Lake islands of Italy